Made Up in Blue is a 1986 EP by New Zealand indie rock group the Bats.

Recording and release
In 1985, the Bats were touring Britain and Germany, including playing support for Alex Chilton. They recorded the Made Up in Blue EP at the 24 track Point Studio in London in December 1985.

"Made Up in Blue" was the first single ever released in the U.K. by Flying Nun. It was awarded "Single of the Week" by the influential British magazine, NME.

Additional releases
In 1990, Flying Nun released the first three Bats EPs as Compiletely Bats. The three tracks from Made Up in Blue were also added to CD reissues of the band's debut album, Daddy's Highway.

Track listing
All songs written by Robert Scott.

Side one
"Made Up in Blue" – 4:00

Side two
"Trouble in This Town" – 2:25
"Mad on You" – 2:30

Personnel
The Bats
Robert Scott – guitar, lead vocals
Kaye Woodward - guitars, vocals
Paul Kean – bass guitar, vocals
Malcolm Grant – drums

Technical
Johnny Milton – engineer, co-producer
The Bats – co-producers, musical arrangers
Robert Raith – art

References

1986 EPs
The Bats (New Zealand band) albums
Flying Nun Records EPs
Flying Nun Records singles